Deford may refer to:

 Deford, Michigan, United States, a community in Tuscola County
 Frank Deford (1938–2017), American sportswriter and commentator
 Miriam Allen deFord (1888–1975), American writer
 DeFord Bailey (1899–1982), early country music star and the first African American performer on the Grand Ole Opry